The following radio stations broadcast on AM frequency 1610 kHz.

AM 1610 is currently exclusively used in the United States by low-power travelers' information stations. The frequency is sparsely used elsewhere in North America, where it is classified as a "regional" frequency.  Only stations in Canada's two largest cities use the frequency, and one Mexican station has been authorized for its use.

Canada

United States 
All stations at 1610 in the United States currently operate as Travelers' information stations.

References

Lists of radio stations by frequency